Wild at Heart is the second studio album by Australian country music singer Beccy Cole. It was released in January 2001 and peaked at number 82 on the ARIA Charts. The album was certified gold in 2003.

At the ARIA Music Awards of 2001, the album was nominated for ARIA Award for Best Country Album, losing out to Looking Forward, Looking Back by Slim Dusty.

Critical reception
Country Music Australia said; "One of the most truly anticipated releases for some years, the groundswell for Beccy has been growing since her debut self-titled release 4 years ago. During that time thousands have enjoyed her vibrant shows around the country... Now here it is and worth every minute of the wait. Beccy has enlisted many of her friends in the completion of this one, starting with Rod McCormack as producer." adding, "Beccy's never been in finer voice, and the enjoyment of finally recording just shines through this one... A Bonus track is the recording at the Gympie Muster last year with Darren, Adam and Felicity of Dolly Parton’s "Do I Ever Cross Your Mind" which picked up the Golden Guitar for vocal Collaboration this year" concluding with "Beccy Cole is a sizeable talent to be reckoned with."

Track listing
 "This Heart" (Al Anderson, Robert Ellis Orrall) – 3:51
 "Too Strong to Break" (Beccy Cole, Rod McCormack, Rick Price) – 3:34
 "Wild at Heart" (Al Anderson, Lari White) – 2:43
 "Never Sees Anything Through" (Cole, Tamara Stewart) – 3:47
 "Keep on Rockin'" (Al Anderson, Craig Wiseman) – 3:43
 "Ordinary Heart" (Emmylou Harris, Kimmie Rhodes) – 2:58
 "Storm in a D Cup" (Cole, Tamara Stewart) – 3:50
 "Friends for a Lifetime (Song for Kegan)" (Claire Lynch, Susan Stewart) – 3:03
 "Mother Knows Best"  (with Carol Sturzel)  (Cole, Tamara Stewart) – 3:59
 "Emily" (featuring Gina Jeffreys) (Beth Nielsen Chapman) – 4:55
 "Lazy Bones" (Cole) – 4:43
 "Do I Ever Cross Your Mind"  (featuring Darren Coggan and Felicity) (live)  (Darren Coggan, Cole, Felicity, Adam Harvey, Dolly Parton) – 2:45

Charts

Weekly charts

Certifications

Release history

References

2001 albums
Beccy Cole albums
Albums produced by Rod McCormack